A linear motor is an electric motor that has had its stator and rotor "unrolled", thus, instead of producing a torque (rotation), it produces a linear force along its length. However, linear motors are not necessarily straight. Characteristically, a linear motor's active section has ends, whereas more conventional motors are arranged as a continuous loop.

A typical mode of operation is as a Lorentz-type actuator, in which the applied force is linearly proportional to the current and the magnetic field .

Linear motors are by far most commonly found in high accuracy engineering applications. It is a thriving field of applied research with dedicated scientific conferences and engineering text books.

Many designs have been put forward for linear motors, falling into two major categories, low-acceleration and high-acceleration linear motors. Low-acceleration linear motors are suitable for maglev trains and other ground-based transportation applications. High-acceleration linear motors are normally rather short, and are designed to accelerate an object to a very high speed, for example see the coilgun.

High-acceleration linear motors are typically used in studies of hypervelocity collisions, as weapons, or as mass drivers for spacecraft propulsion. They are usually of the AC linear induction motor (LIM) design with an active three-phase winding on one side of the air-gap and a passive conductor plate on the other side. However, the direct current homopolar linear motor railgun is another high acceleration linear motor design. The low-acceleration, high speed and high power motors are usually of the linear synchronous motor (LSM) design, with an active winding on one side of the air-gap and an array of alternate-pole magnets on the other side. These magnets can be permanent magnets or electromagnets. The motor for the Shanghai maglev train, for instance, is an LSM.

Types

Brushless 
Brushless linear motors are members of the Synchronous motor family. They are typically used in standard linear stages or integrated into custom, high performance positioning systems. Invented in late 1980s by Anwar Chitayat at Anorad Corporation, now Rockwell Automation, and helped improving throughput and quality of industrial manufacturing processes.

Brush 
Brush (electric) linear motors were used in industrial automation applications prior to the invention of Brushless linear motors. Compared with three phase Brushless motors, which are typically being used today, brush motors operates with a single phase. Brush linear motors have lower cost since they do not need moving cables and three phase servo drives. However, they require higher maintenance since their brushes wear out.

Synchronous 
In this design the rate of movement of the magnetic field is controlled, usually electronically, to track the motion of the rotor. For cost reasons synchronous linear motors rarely use commutators, so the rotor often contains permanent magnets, or soft iron. Examples include coilguns and the motors used on some maglev systems, as well as many other linear motors. In high precision industrial automation linear motors are typically configured with a magnet stator and a moving coil. A  Hall effect sensor is attached to the rotor to track the magnetic flux of the stator. The electrical current is typically provided from a stationary servo drive to the moving coil by a moving cable inside a cable carrier.

Induction 

In this design, the force is produced by a moving linear magnetic field acting on conductors in the field. Any conductor, be it a loop, a coil or simply a piece of plate metal, that is placed in this field will have eddy currents induced in it thus creating an opposing magnetic field, in accordance with Lenz's law. The two opposing fields will repel each other, thus creating motion as the magnetic field sweeps through the metal.

Homopolar 

In this design a large current is passed through a metal sabot across sliding contacts that are fed from two rails. The magnetic field this generates causes the metal to be projected along the rails.

Tubular 

Efficient and compact design applicable to replacement of pneumatic cylinders.

Piezoelectric 

Piezoelectric drive is often used to drive small linear motors.

History

Low acceleration 
The history of linear electric motors can be traced back at least as far as the 1840s, to the work of Charles Wheatstone at King's College London, but Wheatstone's model was too inefficient to be practical. The German engineer Hermann Kemper built a working model in 1935. In the late 1940s, Dr. Eric Laithwaite of Manchester University, later Professor of Heavy Electrical Engineering at Imperial College in London developed the first full-size working model. In a single sided version the magnetic repulsion forces the conductor away from the stator, levitating it, and carrying it along in the direction of the moving magnetic field. He called the later versions of it magnetic river. The technologies would later be applied, in the 1984, Air-Rail Link shuttle, between Birmingham's airport and an adjacent train station.

Because of these properties, linear motors are often used in maglev propulsion, as in the Japanese Linimo magnetic levitation train line near Nagoya. However, linear motors have been used independently of magnetic levitation, as in the Bombardier Innovia Metro systems worldwide and a number of modern Japanese subways, including Tokyo's Toei Ōedo Line.

Similar technology is also used in some roller coasters with modifications but, at present, is still impractical on street running trams, although this, in theory, could be done by burying it in a slotted conduit.

Outside of public transportation, vertical linear motors have been proposed as lifting mechanisms in deep mines, and the use of linear motors is growing in motion control applications. They are also often used on sliding doors, such as those of low floor trams such as the Alstom Citadis and the Socimi Eurotram. Dual axis linear motors also exist. These specialized devices have been used to provide direct X-Y motion for precision laser cutting of cloth and sheet metal, automated drafting, and cable forming. Most linear motors in use are LIM (linear induction motor), or LSM (linear synchronous motor). Linear DC motors are not used due to higher cost and linear SRM suffers from poor thrust. So for long run in traction LIM is mostly preferred and for short run LSM is mostly preferred.

High acceleration 
High-acceleration linear motors have been suggested for a number of uses.
They have been considered for use as weapons, since current armour-piercing ammunition tends to consist of small rounds with very high kinetic energy, for which just such motors are suitable. Many amusement park launched roller coasters now use linear induction motors to propel the train at a high speed, as an alternative to using a lift hill. The United States Navy is also using linear induction motors in the Electromagnetic Aircraft Launch System that will replace traditional steam catapults on future aircraft carriers. They have also been suggested for use in spacecraft propulsion. In this context they are usually called mass drivers. The simplest way to use mass drivers for spacecraft propulsion would be to build a large mass driver that can accelerate cargo up to escape velocity, though RLV launch assist like StarTram to low Earth orbit has also been investigated.

High-acceleration linear motors are difficult to design for a number of reasons. They require large amounts of energy in very short periods of time. One rocket launcher design calls for 300 GJ for each launch in the space of less than a second. Normal electrical generators are not designed for this kind of load, but short-term electrical energy storage methods can be used. Capacitors are bulky and expensive but can supply large amounts of energy quickly. Homopolar generators can be used to convert the kinetic energy of a flywheel into electric energy very rapidly. High-acceleration linear motors also require very strong magnetic fields; in fact, the magnetic fields are often too strong to permit the use of superconductors. However, with careful design, this need not be a major problem.

Two different basic designs have been invented for high-acceleration linear motors: railguns and coilguns.

Usage 
Linear motors are commonly used for actuating high performance industrial automation equipment. Their advantage, unlike any other commonly used actuator, such as ball screw, timing belt, or rack and pinion, is that they provide any combination of high precision, high velocity, high force and long travel.

Linear motors are widely used. One of the major uses of linear motors is for propelling the shuttle in looms.

Linear motors have been used for sliding doors and various similar actuators. Also, they have been used for baggage handing and even large-scale bulk materials transport.

Linear motors are sometimes used to create rotary motion, for example, they have been used at observatories to deal with the large radius of curvature.

Linear motors may also be used as an alternative to conventional chain-run lift hills for roller coasters. The coaster Maverick at Cedar Point uses one such linear motor in place of a chain lift.

A linear motor has been used for accelerating cars for crash tests.

Industrial automation 
The combination of high precision, high velocity, high force, and long travel makes brushless linear motors attractive for driving industrial automations equipment. They serve industries and applications such as semiconductor steppers, electronics surface-mount technology, automotive cartesian coordinate robots, aerospace chemical milling, optics electron microscope, healthcare laboratory automation, food and beverage pick and place.

Machine tools 
Synchronous linear motor actuators, used in machine tools, provide high force, high velocity, high precision and high dynamic stiffness, resulting in high smoothness of motion and low settling time. They may reach velocities of 2 m/s and micron-level accuracies, at short cycle times and a smooth surface finish.

Train propulsion

Conventional rails 
All of the following applications are in rapid transit and have the active part of the motor in the cars.

Bombardier Innovia Metro 

Originally developed in the late 1970s by UTDC in Canada as the Intermediate Capacity Transit System (ICTS). A test track was constructed in Millhaven, Ontario, for extensive testing of prototype cars, after which three lines were constructed:
 Line 3 Scarborough in Toronto (opened 1985)
 Expo Line of the Vancouver SkyTrain (opened 1985 and extended in 1994)
 Detroit People Mover in Detroit (opened 1987)
ICTS was sold to Bombardier Transportation in 1991 and later known as Advanced Rapid Transit (ART) before adopting its current branding in 2011. Since then, several more installations have been made:
 Kelana Jaya Line in Kuala Lumpur (opened 1998 and extended in 2016)
 Millennium Line of the Vancouver SkyTrain (opened 2002 and extended in 2016)
 AirTrain JFK in New York (opened 2003)
 Airport Express (Beijing Subway) (opened 2008)
 Everline in Yongin, South Korea (opened 2013)
All Innovia Metro systems use third rail electrification.

Japanese Linear Metro 
One of the biggest challenges faced by Japanese railway engineers in the 1970s to the 1980s was the ever increasing construction costs of subways. In response, the Japan Subway Association began studying on the feasibility of the "mini-metro" for meeting urban traffic demand in 1979. In 1981, the Japan Railway Engineering Association studied on the use of linear induction motors for such small-profile subways and by 1984 was investigating on the practical applications of linear motors for urban rail with the Japanese Ministry of Land, Infrastructure, Transport and Tourism. In 1988, a successful demonstration was made with the Limtrain at Saitama and influenced the eventual adoption of the linear motor for the Nagahori Tsurumi-ryokuchi Line in Osaka and Toei Line 12 (present-day Toei Oedo Line) in Tokyo.

To date, the following subway lines in Japan use linear motors and use overhead lines for power collection:
 Two Osaka Metro lines in Osaka:
 Nagahori Tsurumi-ryokuchi Line (opened 1990)
 Imazatosuji Line (opened 2006)
 Toei Ōedo Line in Tokyo (opened 2000)
 Kaigan Line of the Kobe Municipal Subway (opened 2001)
 Nanakuma Line of the Fukuoka City Subway (opened 2005)
 Yokohama Municipal Subway Green Line (opened 2008)
 Sendai Subway Tōzai Line (opened 2015)

In addition, Kawasaki Heavy Industries has also exported the Linear Metro to the Guangzhou Metro in China; all of the Linear Metro lines in Guangzhou use third rail electrification:
 Line 4 (opened 2005)
 Line 5 (opened 2009).
 Line 6 (opened 2013)

Monorail 

 There is at least one known monorail system which is not magnetically levitated, but nonetheless uses linear motors. This is the Moscow Monorail. Originally, traditional motors and wheels were to be used. However, it was discovered during test runs that the proposed motors and wheels would fail to provide adequate traction under some conditions, for example, when ice appeared on the rail. Hence, wheels are still used, but the trains use linear motors to accelerate and slow down. This is possibly the only use of such a combination, due to the lack of such requirements for other train systems.
 The TELMAGV is a prototype of a monorail system that is also not magnetically levitated but uses linear motors.

Magnetic levitation 

 High-speed trains:
 Transrapid: first commercial use in Shanghai (opened in 2004)
 SCMaglev, under construction in Japan (fastest train in the world, planned to open by 2027)
 Rapid transit:
 Birmingham Airport, UK (opened 1984, closed 1995)
 M-Bahn in Berlin, Germany (opened in 1989, closed in 1991)
 Daejeon EXPO, Korea (ran only 1993)
 HSST: Linimo line in Aichi Prefecture, Japan (opened 2005)
 Incheon Airport Maglev (opened July 2014)
 Changsha Maglev Express (opened 2016)
 S1 line of Beijing Subway (opened 2017)

Amusement rides 

There are many roller coasters throughout the world that use LIMs to accelerate the ride vehicles. The first being Flight of Fear at Kings Island and Kings Dominion, both opening in 1996. Battlestar Galactica: Human VS Cylon & Revenge of the Mummy at Universal Studios Singapore opened in 2010. They both use LIMs to accelerate from certain point in the rides.

Revenge of the Mummy also is located at Universal Studios Hollywood and Universal Studios Florida. The Incredible Hulk Coaster and VelociCoaster at Universal's Islands of Adventure also uses linear motors. At Walt Disney World, Rock 'n' Roller Coaster Starring Aerosmith at Disney's Hollywood Studios and Guardians of the Galaxy: Cosmic Rewind at Epcot both use LSM to launch their ride vehicles into their indoor ride enclosures.

Aircraft launching 
 Electromagnetic Aircraft Launch System

Proposed and research 
 Launch loop – A proposed system for launching vehicles into space using a linear motor powered loop
 StarTram – Concept for a linear motor on extreme scale
 Tether cable catapult system
 Aérotrain S44 – A suburban commuter hovertrain prototype
 Research Test Vehicle 31 – A hovercraft-type vehicle guided by a track
 Hyperloop – a conceptual high-speed transportation system put forward by entrepreneur Elon Musk
 Elevator 
 Lift 
 Magway - a UK freight delivery system under research and development that aims to deliver goods in pods via 90 cm diameter pipework under and over ground.

See also 

 Linear actuator
 Linear induction motor
 Linear motion
 Maglev
 Online Electric Vehicle
 Reciprocating electric motor
 Sawyer motor
 Tubular linear motor

References

External links 

 Design equations, spreadsheet, and drawings
 Motor torque calculation
 Overview of Electromagnetic Guns

Electric motors
English inventions
 
Linear motion